Garsia is a surname. Notable people with the surname include:

Adriano Garsia (born 1928), Tunisian-born Italian American mathematician
Alfredo Maria Garsia (1928–2004), Italian Roman Catholic bishop
Rupert Clare Garsia (1887–1954), New Zealand-born Australian Navy commander

See also
García (surname)